The Triple Alliance was a military alliance between Germany, Austria-Hungary, and Italy. It was formed on 20 May 1882 and renewed periodically until it expired in 1915 during World War I. Germany and Austria-Hungary had been closely allied since 1879.  Italy was looking for support against France shortly after it lost North African ambitions to the French.  Each member promised mutual support in the event of an attack by any other great power.  The treaty provided that Germany and Austria-Hungary were to assist Italy if it was attacked by France without provocation.  In turn, Italy would assist Germany if attacked by France. In the event of a war between Austria-Hungary and Russia, Italy promised to remain neutral. The existence and membership of the treaty were well known, but its exact provisions were kept secret until 1919.

When the treaty was renewed in February 1887, Italy gained an empty promise of German support of Italian colonial ambitions in North Africa in return for Italy's continued friendship. Austria-Hungary had to be pressured by German chancellor Otto von Bismarck into accepting the principles of consultation and mutual agreement with Italy on any territorial changes initiated in the Balkans or on the coasts and islands of the Adriatic and Aegean seas. Italy and Austria-Hungary did not overcome their basic conflict of interest in that region despite the treaty.  In 1891, attempts were made to join Britain to the Triple Alliance, which, though unsuccessful, were widely believed to have succeeded in Russian diplomatic circles.

Shortly after renewing the Alliance in June 1902, Italy secretly extended a similar guarantee to France. By a particular agreement, neither Austria-Hungary nor Italy would change the status quo in the Balkans without previous consultation.

On 18 October 1883 Carol I of Romania, through his Prime Minister Ion C. Brătianu, had also secretly pledged to support the Triple Alliance, but he later remained neutral in the First World War due to viewing Austria-Hungary as the aggressor. On 1 November 1902, five months after the Triple Alliance was renewed, Italy reached an understanding with France that each would remain neutral in the event of an attack on the other.

When Austria-Hungary found itself at war in August 1914 with the rival Triple Entente, Italy proclaimed its neutrality, considering Austria-Hungary the aggressor. Italy also defaulted on the obligation to consult and agree to compensations before changing the status quo in the Balkans, as agreed in 1912 renewal of the Triple Alliance.   Following parallel negotiation with both Triple Alliance (which aimed to keep Italy neutral) and the Triple Entente (which aimed to make Italy enter the conflict), Italy sided with the Triple Entente and declared war on Austria-Hungary.

Germany
The man chiefly responsible for the Triple Alliance was Otto von Bismarck, the Chancellor of Germany. His primary goal was to preserve the status quo in Europe after he had unified Germany in 1871. He was particularly concerned about France finding allies to help it regain Alsace-Lorraine. By promising to aid Austria-Hungary and Italy in the event of attack, Bismarck sought to make them somewhat dependent on Germany and therefore unsympathetic to French adventures.

Austria-Hungary
By the late 1870s, Austrian territorial ambitions in both the Italian Peninsula and Central Europe had been thwarted by the rise of Italy and Germany as new powers. With the decline and the failed reforms of the Ottoman Empire, Slavic discontent in the occupied Balkans grew, which both Russia and Austria-Hungary saw as an opportunity to expand in the region. In 1876, Russia offered to partition the Balkans, but the Hungarian statesman Gyula Andrássy declined because Austria-Hungary was already a "saturated" state and could not cope with additional territories. The whole empire was thus drawn into a new style of diplomatic brinkmanship, which was first conceived of by Andrássy, centering on the province of Bosnia and Herzegovina, a predominantly-Slav area that was still under the control of the Ottoman Empire.

On the heels of the Great Balkan Crisis, Austro-Hungarian forces occupied Bosnia and Herzegovina in August 1878, and Austria-Hungary eventually annexed Bosnia and Herzegovina in October 1908 as a common holding under the control of the finance ministry, rather than attaching it to either Austria or Hungary. The occupation of Bosnia-Herzegovina was a step taken in response to Russian advances into Bessarabia. Unable to mediate between the Ottoman and the Russian Empires over the control of Serbia, Austria–Hungary declared neutrality when the conflict between the empires escalated into war. To counter Russian and French interests in Europe, an alliance was concluded with Germany in October 1879 and with Italy in May 1882.

Italy

Italy had several motives for joining the existing Austro-German alliance. The Italian government at that time was controlled by conservatives, who sympathized ideologically with the two monarchies. Also, Catholic Austria was a traditional protector of the Vatican, which Italy wanted to absorb. However, perhaps most importantly, Italy was seeking potential allies against France. The Kingdom of Italy, like most of the other European powers, wanted to set up colonies and build up an overseas empire. Although France had supported Italian unification, Italy's colonial ambitions in Africa quickly brought it into a rivalry with France. That was reflected in anger at the French seizure of Tunisia in 1881, the so-called Schiaffo di Tunisi by Italian press, which many Italians had seen as a potential colony. By joining the Alliance, Italy hoped to guarantee itself support in case of foreign aggression. The main alliance compelled any signatory country to support the other parties if two other countries attacked. Germany had won a war against France in 1870 and was a natural ally for Italy. Thus, Italy found itself coming to terms with its historical enemy, Austria-Hungary, against which Italy had fought three wars in the 34 years before the signing of the first treaty.

However, Italian public opinion remained unenthusiastic about their country's alignment with Austria-Hungary, a past enemy of Italian unification and whose Italian-populated districts in the Trentino and Istria were seen as occupied territories by Italian irredentists. In the years before World War I, many distinguished military analysts predicted that Italy would attack its supposed ally in the event of a large scale conflict. Italy's adherence to the Triple Alliance was doubted, and from 1903 plans for a possible war against Rome were again maintained by the Austro-Hungarian General Staff. Mutual suspicions led to reinforcement of the frontier and speculation in the press about a war between the two countries into the first decade of the 20th century. As late as 1911, Count Franz Conrad von Hötzendorf, the chief of the Austro-Hungarian General Staff, was advocating a preemptive strike against Austria's supposed Italian ally. That prediction was strengthened by Italy's invasion and annexation of Libya, bringing it into conflict with the German-backed Ottoman Empire.

Romania
King Carol I of Romania was of German ancestry, which, combined with his wish to turn Romania into a centre of stability in Southeastern Europe and his fear of Russian expansion and the competing claims on Bessarabia, led to Romania secretly joining the Triple Alliance on 18 October 1883. Only the King and a handful of senior Romanian politicians knew about it. Romania and Austria-Hungary pledged to help each other in the event of a Russian, Serbian or Bulgarian attack. There were, however, several disputes between Romania and Hungary, the most notable being the status and community rights of Romanians in Transylvania. Romania eventually managed to achieve the status of regional power in the aftermath of the Balkan Wars and the 1913 Treaty of Bucharest, but less than a year later, World War I started, and Romania, after a period of neutrality in which both the Central Powers and the Allies tried persuading Romania to join their respective sides, eventually joined the Allies in 1916, after it had been promised significant Romanian-inhabited Hungarian lands. Romania's official reason for not siding with the Triple Alliance when the war started was the same as Italy's: The Triple Alliance was a defensive alliance, but Germany and Austria-Hungary had taken the offensive.

Notes

References

Sources
 Conybeare, John A. C., and Todd Sandler (December 1990). "The Triple Entente and the Triple Alliance 1880–1914: A Collective Goods Approach" (PDF). American Political Science Review. 84(4): 1197–1206. .
 Conybeare, John A. C. (March 1992). "A Portfolio Diversification Model of Alliances: The Triple Alliance and Triple Entente, 1879–1914". Journal of Conflict Resolution 36.1: 53–85. .
 
 Langer, William L. (1951). European Alliances and Alignments, 1871–1890 (2nd ed.).  pp. 217–50. A standard scholarly history.
 Lutz, Ralph Haswell (ed.)(1932). Fall of the German Empire, 1914–1918 (Documents of the German Revolution, volumes I and II). Stanford, Calif.: Stanford University Press. Online review. Primary sources.
 Macmillan, Margaret (2013). The War That Ended Peace: The Road to 1914. Chapter 8.
 Pribram, Alfred Francis (ed.)(1921). The Secret Treaties of Austria-Hungary, 1879–1914 Vol. 2. The most thorough history of the Triple Alliance, with text of major documents.
 
 Schmitt, Bernadotte E. (1924). "Triple Alliance and Triple Entente, 1902–1914". American Historical Review. 29#3: 449–473. .
 Sontag, Raymond James (1933). European Diplomatic History, 1871–1932. Century Historical Series. New York: Century Company. pp. 99–152. . Online review.

1882 in Austria-Hungary
1882 in Germany
1882 in Hungary
1882 in Italy
1882 treaties
1882 in international relations
19th-century military alliances
20th-century military alliances
Austria-Hungary–Germany relations
Austria-Hungary–Italy relations
Germany–Italy relations
History of international relations
Military alliances involving Austria-Hungary
Military alliances involving Italy
Military alliances involving Romania
Military alliances involving the German Empire
Politics of the Ottoman Empire
Secret treaties
World War I by country